Haywood Scissum (November 19, 1924 – August 28, 1995) was the 11th head football coach at Tuskegee University in Tuskegee, Alabama and he held that position for 11 seasons, from 1970 until 1980.  His coaching record at Tuskegee was 65–48–1.

References

1924 births
1995 deaths
Tuskegee Golden Tigers football coaches